The physically identical Palatine and Bavarian Class R 4/4 engines of the Royal Bavarian State Railways (Königlich Bayerische Staats-Eisenbahnen) were goods train tank locomotives with four coupled axles and no carrying axles. The first nine machines were built for the Palatinate Railway (Pfalzbahn) in 1913 and 1915 as the Palatine Class R 4, the remainder from 1918 to 1925 as Bavarian R 4/4 engines.

The first nine machines were built as the Palatinate R 4/4 in 1913 and 1915 for the Palatinate Railway, the remainder in years 1918/19 and 1924/25 as the Bavarian R 4/4. Structurally they were similar to the Baden X b. A peculiarity was the high boiler, under which the water tank was also located. Sand dome and steam dome formed a single structural unit. The locomotives could haul up to 1,000 tons on the level. On a gradient of 5‰ and a load of 246 tons a speed of 45 km/h was achieved. The last series differed from its predecessors in that the arrangement of the domes and the water box was changed.

In 1925 seven Palatine R 4/4 with operating numbers 92 2001 to 92 2007 and all the Bavarian R 4/4 with operating numbers 92 2008 to 92 2049 were incorporated by the Deutsche Reichsbahn into their numbering plan as Class 92.20.

The first Palatine engines began to be taken out of service from the mid-1930s; the last ones in he 1950s. In 1962 the last one, No. 2024, stabled in Nuremberg was retired.

See also
 Royal Bavarian State Railways
 List of Bavarian locomotives and railbuses

References

Literature 

0-8-0T locomotives
R 4 4
Railway locomotives introduced in 1913
Krauss locomotives
Standard gauge locomotives of Germany
D n2t locomotives
Freight locomotives